The 2005 TCU Horned Frogs football team represented Texas Christian University in the 2005 NCAA Division I-A football season. TCU finished with an 11–1 (8–0 Mountain West Conference) record and a #11 ranking in the AP Poll.

The team was coached by Gary Patterson and played their home games at Amon G. Carter Stadium, which is located on campus in Fort Worth. TCU finished with a 27–24 victory over Iowa State in the 2005 Houston Bowl. This was TCU's first year in the Mountain West Conference (MWC), and they won their first MWC championship. It was TCU's first outright conference championship since 1958. The previous four years TCU competed in Conference USA.

Schedule

Season summary
TCU started off the season with a 17–10 victory over #7 ranked Oklahoma. It was Oklahoma's first home loss since 2001 and the first September loss for Oklahoma since Bob Stoops became head coach. About the loss running back Adrian Peterson said, "Right now, I'm kind of shocked." TCU held Peterson to 63 yards rushing and Oklahoma to 225 yards of total offense.

On September 10, in the Battle for the Iron Skillet, TCU lost 21–10 to SMU. It was SMU's first victory over a ranked team since October 1, 1986. During the game, TCU had 4 turnovers to SMU's 1 turnover. TCU had beaten SMU six straight times before the loss. Placekicker Peter LoCoco missed three of his four field goal attempts during the game.

TCU beat Utah 23–20 in overtime on September 15 in a Thursday night game. The victory ended Utah's 18-game winning streak. TCU followed that game up with another overtime victory against BYU. TCU rallied from an 18-point deficit late in the third quarter to force overtime.  With just under two minutes to go in the third quarter, BYU led 34–16, but TCU was able to outscore BYU 28–10 through the rest of regulation. In overtime, BYU missed an extra point attempt, after taking the lead on a touchdown. On TCU's ensuing possession, they managed to score a touchdown and score the conversion for the 51–50 victory.

After those back-to-back overtime contests, TCU won their next seven games by an average of 25 points. During the streak, TCU beat, in order, New Mexico, Wyoming, Army, Air Force, San Diego State, Colorado State, and UNLV.

The BCS eligibility guidelines were revised following this season.  Had they been in force during this season, TCU would have received an automatic bid to a BCS bowl.

TCU finished the year with a 27–24 victory in the 2005 Houston Bowl over Iowa State. The victory extended the Horned Frogs' winning streak to ten games.  Peter LoCoco made 44-yard field goal with 5:25 left in the game to break a 24–24 tie. After the game, LoCoco said, "This is perfect. This is redemption. I'm glad I got the opportunity. This was a big confidence booster." He had missed three kicks in TCU's loss to SMU.

TCU finished the year ranked #11 in the AP Poll and #9 in the Coaches' Poll, the only non-AQ conference team to be ranked in either final poll.

Roster

References

TCU
TCU Horned Frogs football seasons
Mountain West Conference football champion seasons
Houston Bowl champion seasons
TCU Horned Frogs football